Celestini is an Italian surname. Notable people with the surname include:

Andrea Celestini (1773–1830s), Italian painter
Costanzo Celestini (born 1961), Italian footballer
Fabio Celestini (born 1975), Swiss footballer and manager
Federico Celestini (born 1964), Italian musicologist
Nazzareno Celestini (born 1914), Italian footballer

Italian-language surnames